Gorybia chontalensis is a species of beetle in the family Cerambycidae (Longhorn Beetle). Gorybia Chontalensis is Extant and It is found in Costa Rica & Nicaragua. It was first described by Bates in 1880.

See also
 Gorybia

References

Piezocerini